The men's doubles competition of the table tennis events at the 2019 Southeast Asian Games was held from 6 to 7 December at the Subic Bay Exhibition & Convention Center in Subic Bay Freeport Zone, Zambales, Philippines.

Schedule
All times are Philippines Time (UTC+08:00).

Results

References

External links
 

Men's doubles
South